Urbananthus is a genus of Caribbean plants in the tribe Eupatorieae within the family Asteraceae.

The genus is named in honor of German botanist Ignatz Urban, 1848–1931.

 Species
 Urbananthus critoniformis (Urb.) R.M.King & H.Rob. - Jamaica
 Urbananthus pluriseriatus (B.L.Rob.) R.M.King & H.Rob. - Cuba

References

Eupatorieae
Flora of the Caribbean
Asteraceae genera